Pilocarpus jaborandi is a species of flowering plant in the family Rutaceae, native to northeast Brazil. It is a source of the drug pilocarpine.

References

Endemic flora of Brazil
Flora of Northeast Brazil
Plants described in 1892
Zanthoxyloideae